Agios Konstantinos ( meaning Saint Constantine, before 1954: Καμάριζα - Kamariza) is a village and a former community in East Attica, Greece. Since the 2011 local government reform it is part of the municipality Lavreotiki, of which it is a municipal unit. It was named after Saint Constantine.

Geography

Agios Konstantinos is situated in the hills in the southeastern part of the Attica peninsula, at about 160 m elevation. It is 4 km west of the Aegean Sea coast at Lavrio and 38 km southeast of Athens city centre. The municipal unit has an area of 10.450 km2. There are several mines in the vicinity of Agios Konstantinos and neighboring Lavrio. In antiquity it was known for silver mines, currently minerals including azurite, chalcoalumite, calcite, austinite and adamite are found.

The community Agios Konstantinos also includes the village Esperídes (pop. 69).

Historical population

See also
List of municipalities of Attica

References

External links
GTP Travel Pages (Community)

Populated places in East Attica